
Gorlice County is a unit of territorial administration and local government (powiat) in Lesser Poland Voivodeship, southern Poland, on the Slovak border. It was created on 1 January 1999 as a result of the Polish local government reforms passed in 1998.

As of 2019 its total population is 116,865, out of which the population of Gorlice is 27,442, that of Biecz is 4,590, that of Bobowa is 3,136, and the rural population is 81,697.

Neighbouring counties
Gorlice County is bordered by Nowy Sącz County to the west, Tarnów County to the north and Jasło County to the east. It also borders Slovakia to the south.

Administrative division
The county is subdivided into 10 gminas (one urban, two urban-rural and seven rural). These are listed in the following table, in descending order of population.

References

 
Gorlice